Earl Mohan (November 12, 1889 – October 15, 1928) was an American film actor of the silent era who was born in Pueblo, Colorado, and died in Los Angeles, California. He appeared in about 60 films between 1915 and 1927, usually in short film comedies. He was a leading man in a number of - today forgotten - Hal Roach comedies of the 1920s. Mohan also played in numerous Harold Lloyd films, including his part as the eccentric drunk in Safety Last! (1923).

Selected filmography

 Ragtime Snap Shots (1915)
 A Foozle at the Tee Party (1915)
 Luke and the Rural Roughnecks (1916)
 Luke's Preparedness Preparations (1916)
 Luke, the Gladiator (1916)
 Luke, Patient Provider (1916)
 Luke's Newsie Knockout (1916)
 Luke's Movie Muddle (1916)
 Luke, Rank Impersonator (1916)
 Luke's Fireworks Fizzle (1916)
 Luke Locates the Loot (1916)
 Luke's Shattered Sleep (1916)
 Luke's Lost Liberty (1917)
 Luke's Busy Day (1917)
 Lonesome Luke on Tin Can Alley (1917)
 Heap Big Chief (1919)
 Pay Your Dues (1919)
 Now or Never (1921)
 Safety Last! (1923)
 Frozen Hearts (1923)
 The Whole Truth (1923)
 Mother's Joy (1923)
 Zeb vs. Paprika (1924)
 Near Dublin (1924)

External links

1889 births
1928 deaths
American male film actors
American male silent film actors
Male actors from Colorado
20th-century American male actors
20th-century American comedians